Lyndsy Marie Fonseca (born January 7, 1987) is an American actress.  She began her career by appearing as Colleen Carlton on the CBS daytime soap opera The Young and the Restless, on which she starred between 2001 and 2005. Thereafter, she had a series of other recurring roles, including Penny Mosby on the CBS sitcom How I Met Your Mother, Donna on HBO's Big Love, and Dylan Mayfair on the fourth season of the ABC television series  Desperate Housewives.

From 2010 to 2013, Fonseca starred as Alex Udinov on The CW's Nikita, and from 2015 to 2016 she played Angie Martinelli on ABC's Marvel's Agent Carter. She has also appeared in a variety of film roles, including Jenny in Hot Tub Time Machine (2010) and Katie Deauxma in Kick-Ass (2010) and its 2013 sequel.

Early life
Fonseca was born in Oakland, California, the daughter of Lima Lynn (née Bergmann) and James Victor Fonseca. She is partly of Portuguese descent. Her mother later married attorney Reid Dworkin, through whom Fonseca has a half-sister, Hannah Leigh Dworkin. Fonseca completed a course at Barbizon Modeling and Acting School in San Francisco and relocated to Los Angeles at age 12. She soon made her screen debut as Colleen Connelly-Carlton on the soap opera The Young and the Restless.

Career
In 2005, Fonseca played a recurring role as Ted Mosby's future daughter on How I Met Your Mother and as Donna on HBO's Big Love. She starred in the 2005 Hallmark TV film Ordinary Miracles, as a 16-year-old juvenile delinquent who goes to live with a judge (Jaclyn Smith). In late 2007, Fonseca played Dawn in the film Remember the Daze. 

She joined the cast of ABC's Desperate Housewives in the series' fourth season as Dylan Mayfair, the daughter of Katherine Mayfair (Dana Delany), a character moving onto Wisteria Lane. In 2008, she was nominated for the Actor award at the Screen Actors Guild Awards for Outstanding Performance by an Ensemble in a Comedy Series for Desperate Housewives, shared with the cast.

Fonseca played Katie Deauxma in the 2010 superhero film Kick-Ass, followed by appearances in three more American films in 2010, including Hot Tub Time Machine. In 2010, Fonseca was cast in a starring role in the CW television series Nikita as Alex, a new recruit, a role she played throughout the series' four seasons. During its run, the Nikita cast included her Kick-Ass co-star Xander Berkeley and her future husband, co-star Noah Bean.

Fonseca starred in the 2021 Disney+ series Turner & Hooch, a remake of the 1989 film of the same name.

Personal life
Fonseca married Matthew Smiley in April 2009. The couple separated in July 2012 and Fonseca filed for divorce in 2013, citing "irreconcilable differences".

In February 2016, Fonseca announced her engagement to her Nikita co-star, actor Noah Bean. She and Bean married on October 2, 2016, in Connecticut. Fonseca and Bean have a daughter born in February 2018. A second daughter was born to the couple in June 2022.

Fonseca was listed at No. 62 on the 2010 Maxim Hot 100 and No. 88 on the 2011 list.

Filmography

Film

Television

Awards and nominations

Notes

References

External links

 
 

1987 births
21st-century American actresses
Actresses from Oakland, California
American child actresses
American film actresses
American people of Portuguese descent
American soap opera actresses
American television actresses
Living people